"It's All in the Game" is a pop song whose most successful version was recorded by Tommy Edwards in 1958. Carl Sigman composed the lyrics in 1951 to a wordless 1911 composition titled "Melody in A Major", written by Charles G. Dawes, who was later Vice President of the United States under Calvin Coolidge. It is the only No. 1 single in the U.S. to have been co-written by a U.S. Vice President or a Nobel Peace Prize laureate (Dawes was both).

The song has become a pop standard, with cover versions by dozens of artists, some of which have been minor hit singles.

Edwards' song ranked at No. 47 on the 2018 list of "The Hot 100's All-Time Top 600 Songs".

"Melody in A Major"
Dawes, a Chicago bank president and amateur pianist and flautist, composed the tune in 1911 in a single sitting at his lakeshore home in Evanston. He played it for a friend, the violinist Francis MacMillen, who took Dawes's sheet music to a publisher. Dawes, known for his federal appointments and a United States Senate candidacy, was surprised to find a portrait of himself in a State Street shop window with copies of the tune for sale. Dawes quipped, "I know that I will be the target of my punster friends. They will say that if all the notes in my bank are as bad as my musical ones, they are not worth the paper they were written on."

The tune, often dubbed "Dawes's Melody", followed him into politics, and he grew to detest hearing it wherever he appeared. It was a favorite of violinist Fritz Kreisler, who used it as his closing number, and in the 1940s it was picked up by musicians such as Tommy Dorsey.

"It's All in the Game"

In summer 1951, the songwriter Carl Sigman had an idea for a song, and Dawes's "Melody" struck him as suitable for his sentimental lyrics. Dawes had died in April of that year. It was recorded that year by Dinah Shore, Sammy Kaye and Carmen Cavallaro, but the first release was by Tommy Edwards in August. Edwards's version reached No. 18 on the Billboard Records Most Played by Disk Jockeys survey dated September 15, 1951. The range of the melody would have been "difficult to sing", so required rearrangement. A jazz arrangement was recorded by Louis Armstrong (vocals) and arranger Gordon Jenkins, with "some of Armstrong's most honey-tinged singing". In 1956, Jenkins would produce a version with Nat King Cole along the same lines.

In 1958, Edwards had only one session left on his MGM contract. Stereophonic sound recording was becoming viable and it was decided to cut a stereo version of "It's All in the Game" with a rock and roll arrangement. The single was released in July and became a hit, reaching number one for six weeks beginning September 29, 1958, making Edwards the first African-American to chart at number one on the Billboard Hot 100. It would also be the last song to hit number one on the R&B Best Seller list. In November, the song hit No. 1 on the UK Singles Chart. The single helped Edwards revive his career for another two years.

All-time charts

Weekly charts (1958)

Monthly charts (1958)

Cliff Richard version
Cliff Richard had a number two hit in the United Kingdom in 1963 and a number 25 hit on the US Hot 100 in 1964. This was Richard's only top 40 hit in the United States in the 1960s (compared to his UK tally of 43) and his last until "Devil Woman" in 1976. In Canada, it reached number one on the CHUM Chart.

Four Tops version
In 1970, the Four Tops had a number five hit in the United Kingdom. Their version peaked at number six on the soul charts and number 24 on the Billboard Hot 100.

Other recordings
 Bing Crosby included his version of "It's All in the Game" on his 1969 album, Hey Jude/Hey Bing!.
 Donny and Marie Osmond included their version of "It's All in the Game" on their 1975 album, Make the World Go Away.
 Van Morrison included his version in a medley with "You Know What They're Writing About" on his 1979 album Into the Music; he also used the song as the B-side of his 1982 single "Cleaning Windows". His cover of the song was voted number 813 on Dave Marsh's list of the "1001 Greatest Singles Ever Made". Morrison also released it on the live albums Live at the Grand Opera House Belfast (1984), A Night in San Francisco (1994) and Live at Austin City Limits Festival (2006).
 Merle Haggard backed by the Strangers recorded a version for his 1984 album It's All in the Game. His version peaked at number 54 on the Billboard Hot Country Singles chart.
 Keith Jarrett performed a piano solo of "It's All in the Game" on the 2004 album The Out-of-Towners, which also features Gary Peacock and Jack DeJohnette.

See also
 List of number-one singles in Australia during the 1950s
 List of number-one singles from the 1950s (UK)
 List of Hot 100 number-one singles of 1958 (U.S.)
 List of number-one R&B singles of 1958 (U.S.)

References

1951 songs
1951 singles
1958 singles
1963 singles
1964 singles
1970 singles
Songs written by Carl Sigman
Tommy Edwards songs
Johnnie Ray songs
Cliff Richard songs
The Lettermen songs
Four Tops songs
Van Morrison songs
Cass Elliot songs
Tom T. Hall songs
Andy Williams songs
Merle Haggard songs
Billboard Hot 100 number-one singles
Cashbox number-one singles
UK Singles Chart number-one singles
Number-one singles in Australia
MGM Records singles
Columbia Graphophone Company singles
Epic Records singles
Capitol Records singles